Banjul is a district in the Banjul Local Government Area of the Gambia.

References 

Populated places in the Gambia
Greater Banjul Area